The 2022–23 Sacramento Kings season is the 78th season for the franchise in the National Basketball Association (NBA), and 39th season in the city of Sacramento. On April 11, 2022, the Sacramento Kings relieved interim head coach Alvin Gentry of his duties. Gentry was named interim head coach after the team fired Luke Walton in November 2021. On May 9, 2022, the Sacramento Kings hired Golden State Warriors assistant coach Mike Brown to become the Kings' new head coach. After the Seattle Mariners qualified for the postseason for the first time since 2001, the Kings enter this season with the longest active postseason drought in the four major North American sports with their last playoff appearance in 2006. Despite starting 0-4, they improved on their 30–52 record from last year by winning their 31st game on February 8, and will attempt to win their first Pacific Division title since 2003, and put an end to an NBA-record 16 season-long playoff drought. 

On March 12, against the Suns, the Kings reached the 40-win mark for the first time since the 2005–06 season. Three days later, the Kings won their 41st game, ending an NBA-record 16 consecutive losing seasons. The day after winning their 41st game, they secured their first winning season in 17 years with their win over the Brooklyn Nets.

Draft picks

Roster

Standings

Division

Conference

Game log

Preseason

|-style="background:#cfc;"
| 1
| October 3
| @ L.A. Lakers
| 
| Keegan Murray (16)
| Monk, Murray (6)
| Dellavedova, Mitchell (3)
| Crypto.com Arena17,919
| 1–0
|-style="background:#cfc;"
| 2
| October 9
| Portland
| 
| Keegan Murray (16)
| Domantas Sabonis (7)
| Davion Mitchell (5)
| Golden 1 Center14,250
| 2–0
|-style="background:#cfc;"
| 3
| October 12
| @ Phoenix
| 
| De'Aaron Fox (15)
| Domantas Sabonis (10)
| Domantas Sabonis (5)
| Footprint Center16,085
| 3–0
|-style="background:#cfc;"
| 4
| October 14
| L.A. Lakers
| 
| De'Aaron Fox (21)
| Domantas Sabonis (12)
| Domantas Sabonis (9)
| Golden 1 Center17,611
| 4–0

Regular season

|-style="background:#fcc
| 1
| October 19
| Portland
| 
| De'Aaron Fox (33)
| Harrison Barnes (8)
| De'Aaron Fox (7)
| Golden 1 Center17,611
| 0–1
|-style="background:#fcc"
| 2
| October 22
| L.A. Clippers
| 
| De'Aaron Fox (36)
| Domantas Sabonis (10)
| Domantas Sabonis (7)
| Golden 1 Center16,296
| 0–2
|-style="background:#fcc"
| 3
| October 23
| @ Golden State
| 
| De'Aaron Fox (26)
| Domantas Sabonis (14)
| De'Aaron Fox (10)
| Chase Center18,064
| 0–3
|-style="background:#fcc"
| 4
| October 27
| Memphis
| 
| De'Aaron Fox (27)
| Domantas Sabonis (11)
| Domantas Sabonis (9)
| Golden 1 Center15,511
| 0–4
|-style="background:#cfc"
| 5
| October 29
| Miami
| 
| Kevin Huerter (27)
| De'Aaron Fox (13)
| Kevin Huerter (7)
| Golden 1 Center14,618
| 1–4
|- style="background:#cfc;"
| 6
| October 31
| @ Charlotte
| 
| Kevin Huerter (26)
| Domantas Sabonis (16)
| Domantas Sabonis (7)
| Spectrum Center12,020
| 2–4

|- style="background:#fcc;"
| 7
| November 2
| @ Miami
| 
| Huerter, Sabonis (22)
| Domantas Sabonis (12)
| Domantas Sabonis (8)
| FTX Arena19,600
| 2–5
|- style="background:#cfc;"
| 8
| November 5
| @ Orlando
| 
| De'Aaron Fox (37)
| Domantas Sabonis (11)
| Domantas Sabonis (6)
| Amway Center18,846
| 3–5
|- style="background:#fcc;"
| 9
| November 7
| @ Golden State
| 
| De'Aaron Fox (28)
| Domantas Sabonis (14)
| Fox, Sabonis (6)
| Chase Center18,064
| 3–6
|-style="background:#cfc;"
| 10
| November 9
| Cleveland
| 
| Domantas Sabonis (21)
| Harrison Barnes (9)
| De'Aaron Fox (8)
| Golden 1 Center13,816
| 4–6
|-style="background:#cfc;"
| 11
| November 11
| @ L.A. Lakers
| 
| De'Aaron Fox (32)
| Domantas Sabonis (10)
| De'Aaron Fox (12)
| Crypto.com Arena17,849
| 5–6
|-style="background:#cfc;"
| 12
| November 7
| Golden State
| 
| Domantas Sabonis (26)
| Domantas Sabonis (22)
| Fox, Sabonis (8)
| Golden 1 Center16,410
| 6–6
|- style="background:#cfc;"
| 13
| November 15
| Brooklyn
| 
| Terence Davis (31)
| Terence Davis (9)
| De'Aaron Fox (9)
| Golden 1 Center17,611
| 7–6
|- style="background:#cfc;"
| 14
| November 17
| San Antonio
| 
| De'Aaron Fox (28)
| Barnes, Sabonis (8)
| De'Aaron Fox (8)
| Golden 1 Center16,522
| 8–6
|- style="background:#cfc;"
| 15
| November 20
| Detroit
| 
| De'Aaron Fox (33)
| Domantas Sabonis (13)
| Fox, Sabonis (7)
| Golden 1 Center17,866
| 9–6
|- style="background:#cfc;"
| 16
| November 22
| @ Memphis
| 
| De'Aaron Fox (32)
| Domantas Sabonis (13)
| Domantas Sabonis (8)
| FedExForum16,826
| 10–6
|-style="background:#fcc;"
| 17
| November 23
| @ Atlanta
| 
| Malik Monk (27)
| Domantas Sabonis (13)
| Domantas Sabonis (7)
| State Farm Arena18,173
| 10–7
|-style="background:#fcc;"
| 18
| November 25
| @ Boston
| 
| De'Aaron Fox (20)
| Murray, Sabonis (10)
| Domantas Sabonis (6)
| TD Garden19,156
| 10–8
|-style="background:#fcc;"
| 19
| November 28
| Phoenix
| 
| Malik Monk (30)
| Domantas Sabonis (9)
| Domantas Sabonis (10)
| Golden 1 Center16,407
| 10–9
|-style="background:#cfc;"
| 20
| November 30
| Indiana
| 
| Harrison Barnes (22)
| Domantas Sabonis (10)
| Domantas Sabonis (7)
| Golden 1 Center17,611
| 11–9

|-style="background:#cfc;"
| 21
| December 3
| @ L.A. Clippers
| 
| Domantas Sabonis (24)
| Chimezie Metu (8)
| Domantas Sabonis (6)
| Crypto.com Arena16,587
| 12–9
|-style="background:#cfc;"
| 22
| December 4
| Chicago
| 
| Malik Monk (20)
| Domantas Sabonis (17)
| Domantas Sabonis (10)
| Golden 1 Center17,611
| 13–9
|-style="background:#fcc;"
| 23
| December 7
| @ Milwaukee
| 
| Domantas Sabonis (23)
| Domantas Sabonis (12)
| Domantas Sabonis (7)
| Fiserv Forum17,341
| 13–10
|-style="background:#cfc;"
| 24
| December 9
| @ Cleveland
| 
| Harrison Barnes (20)
| Domantas Sabonis (18)
| Mitchell, Sabonis (6)
| Rocket Mortgage FieldHouse19,432
| 14–10
|-style="background:#fcc;"
| 25
| December 11
| @ New York
| 
| Domantas Sabonis (20)
| Domantas Sabonis (12)
| Kevin Huerter (6)
| Madison Square Garden19,812
| 14–11
|-style="background:#fcc;"
| 26
| December 13
| @ Philadelphia
| 
| Domantas Sabonis (22)
| Domantas Sabonis (10)
| Domantas Sabonis (5)
| Wells Fargo Center19,768
| 14–12
|-style="background:#cfc;"
| 27
| December 14
| @ Toronto
| 
| De'Aaron Fox (27)
| Domantas Sabonis (20)
| De'Aaron Fox (10)
| Scotiabank Arena19,800
| 15–12
|-style="background:#cfc;"
| 28
| December 16
| @ Detroit
| 
| De'Aaron Fox (24)
| Domantas Sabonis (13)
| De'Aaron Fox (9)
| Little Caesars Arena17,892
| 16–12
|-style="background:#fcc;"
| 29
| December 19
| Charlotte
| 
| De'Aaron Fox (37)
| Domantas Sabonis (23)
| Domantas Sabonis (7)
| Golden 1 Center17,803
| 16–13
|-style="background:#cfc;"
| 30
| December 21
| L.A. Lakers
| 
| Kevin Huerter (26)
| Domantas Sabonis (21)
| Domantas Sabonis (12)
| Golden 1 Center17,611
| 17–13
|-style="background:#fcc;"
| 31
| December 23
| Washington
| 
| De'Aaron Fox (26)
| Domantas Sabonis (15)
| Domantas Sabonis (10)
| Golden 1 Center17,894
| 17–14
|-style="background:#fcc;"
| 32
| December 27
| Denver
| 
| De'Aaron Fox (26)
| Trey Lyles (10)
| Davion Mitchell (9)
| Golden 1 Center17,937
| 17–15
|-style="background:#cfc;"
| 33
| December 28
| Denver
| 
| Malik Monk (33)
| Domantas Sabonis (10)
| De'Aaron Fox (13)
| Golden 1 Center17,985
| 18–15
|-style="background:#cfc;"
| 34
| December 30
| Utah
| 
| Kevin Huerter (30)
| Domantas Sabonis (11)
| De'Aaron Fox (10)
| Golden 1 Center17,946
| 19–15

|-style="background:#fcc;"
| 35
| January 1
| @ Memphis
| 
| De'Aaron Fox (19)
| Domantas Sabonis (14)
| De'Aaron Fox (6)
| FedEx Forum17,794
| 19–16
|-style="background:#cfc;"
| 36
| January 3
| @ Utah
| 
| De'Aaron Fox (37)
| Domantas Sabonis (14)
| Domantas Sabonis (8)
| Vivint Arena18,206
| 20–16
|-style="background:#fcc;"
| 37
| January 4
| Atlanta
| 
| De'Aaron Fox (25)
| Domantas Sabonis (14)
| Domantas Sabonis (8)
| Golden 1 Center17,611
| 20–17
|-style="background:#fcc;"
| 38
| January 7
| L.A. Lakers
| 
| De'Aaron Fox (34)
| Domantas Sabonis (12)
| De'Aaron Fox (9)
| Golden 1 Center17,611
| 20–18
|-style="background:#cfc;"
| 39
| January 9
| Orlando
| 
| Harrison Barnes (30)
| Domantas Sabonis (10)
| De'Aaron Fox (9)
| Golden 1 Center16,499
| 21–18
|-style="background:#cfc;"
| 40
| January 11
| Houston
| 
| Domantas Sabonis (25)
| Domantas Sabonis (14)
| Fox, Sabonis (9)
| Golden 1 Center16,057
| 22–18
|-style="background:#cfc;"
| 41
| January 13
| Houston
| 
| Harrison Barnes (27)
| Domantas Sabonis (15)
| Domantas Sabonis (16)
| Golden 1 Center17,894
| 23–18
|-style="background:#cfc;"
| 42
| January 15
| @ San Antonio
| 
| Harrison Barnes (29)
| Domantas Sabonis (18)
| Domantas Sabonis (8)
| AT&T Center12,339
| 24–18
|-style="background:#cfc;"
| 43
| January 18
| @ L.A. Lakers
| 
| De'Aaron Fox (31)
| Richaun Holmes (11)
| Kevin Huerter (8)
| Crypto.com Arena18,142
| 25–18
|-style="background:#cfc;"
| 44
| January 20
| Oklahoma City
| 
| Keegan Murray (29)
| Murray, Sabonis (14)
| Domantas Sabonis (14)
| Golden 1 Center17,932
| 26–18
|-style="background:#fcc;"
| 45
| January 23
| Philadelphia
| 
| De'Aaron Fox (31)
| Domantas Sabonis (9)
| Domantas Sabonis (10)
| Golden 1 Center17,861
| 26–19
|-style="background:#cfc;"
| 46
| January 21
| Memphis
| 
| Trey Lyles (24)
| Domantas Sabonis (10)
| Domantas Sabonis (11)
| Golden 1 Center17,821
| 27–19
|-style="background:#fcc;"
| 47
| January 25
| Toronto
| 
| Kevin Huerter (21)
| Domantas Sabonis (8)
| De'Aaron Fox (8)
| Golden 1 Center17,767
| 27–20
|-style="background:#fcc;"
| 48
| January 28
| @ Minnesota
| 
| De'Aaron Fox (29)
| Domantas Sabonis (10)
| De'Aaron Fox (6)
| Target Center17,136
| 27–21
|-style="background:#cfc;"
| 49
| January 30
| @ Minnesota
| 
| De'Aaron Fox (32)
| Murray, Sabonis (13)
| Malik Monk (5)
| Target Center15,342
| 28–21

|-style="background:#cfc;"
| 50
| February 1
| @ San Antonio
| 
| Domantas Sabonis (34)
| Domantas Sabonis (11)
| De'Aaron Fox (10)
| AT&T Center13,207
| 29–21
|-style="background:#fcc;"
| 51
| February 3
| @ Indiana
| 
| Harrison Barnes (23)
| Domantas Sabonis (16)
| Domantas Sabonis (6)
| Gainbridge Fieldhouse17,274
| 29–22
|-style="background:#fcc;"
| 52
| February 5
| @ New Orleans
| 
| Malik Monk (16)
| Domantas Sabonis (11)
| Matthew Dellavedova (6)
| Smoothie King Center17,779
| 29–23
|-style="background:#cfc;"
| 53
| February 6
| @ Houston
| 
| Keegan Murray (30)
| Domantas Sabonis (7)
| Domantas Sabonis (10)
| Toyota Center15,405
| 30–23
|-style="background:#cfc;"
| 54
| February 8
| @ Houston
| 
| De'Aaron Fox (31)
| Domantas Sabonis (9)
| De'Aaron Fox (11)
| Toyota Center15,881
| 31–23
|-style="background:#fcc;"
| 55
| February 10
| Dallas
| 
| De'Aaron Fox (33)
| Domantas Sabonis (11)
| Domantas Sabonis (7)
| Golden 1 Center
| 31–24
|-style="background:#cfc;"
| 56
| February 11
| Dallas
| 
| De'Aaron Fox (36)
| Domantas Sabonis (14)
| Fox, Huerter (5)
| Golden 1 Center18,111
| 32–24
|-style="background:#fcc;"
| 57
| February 14
| @ Phoenix
| 
| De'Aaron Fox (35)
| Domantas Sabonis (15)
| Domantas Sabonis (7)
| Footprint Center17,071
| 32–25
|-style="background:#cfc;"
| 58
| February 23
| Portland
| 
| De'Aaron Fox (31)
| Domantas Sabonis (17)
| Domantas Sabonis (10)
| Golden 1 Center18,041
| 33–25
|-style="background:#cfc;"
| 59
| February 24
| @ L.A. Clippers
| 
| Malik Monk (45)
| Domantas Sabonis (10)
| De'Aaron Fox (12)
| Crypto.com Arena19,068
| 34–25
|-style="background:#cfc;"
| 60
| February 26
| @ Oklahoma City
| 
| De'Aaron Fox (33)
| Domantas Sabonis (15)
| Sabonis, Fox (8)
| Paycom Center15,147
| 35–25
|-style="background:#cfc;"
| 61
| February 28
| @ Oklahoma City
| 
| Harrison Barnes (29)
| Domantas Sabonis (13)
| Sabonis, Huerter (9)
| Paycom Center13,353
| 36–25

|-style="background:#cfc;"
| 62
| March 3
| L.A. Clippers
| 
| De'Aaron Fox (33)
| Domantas Sabonis (10)
| Malik Monk (8)
| Golden 1 Center18,111
| 37–25
|-style="background:#fcc;"
| 63
| March 4
| Minnesota
| 
| Kevin Huerter (29)
| Domantas Sabonis (14)
| De'Aaron Fox (7)
| Golden 1 Center18,111
| 37–26
|-style="background:#cfc;"
| 64
| March 6
| New Orleans
| 
| Kevin Huerter (25)
| Domantas Sabonis (11)
| Domantas Sabonis (11)
| Golden 1 Center17,708
| 38–26
|-style="background:#cfc;"
| 65
| March 9
| New York
| 
| Domantas Sabonis (24)
| Domantas Sabonis (13)
| Domantas Sabonis (10)
| Golden 1 Center18,068
| 39–26
|-style="background:#cfc;"
| 66
| March 11
| @ Phoenix
| 
| Harrison Barnes (19)
| Domantas Sabonis (8)
| De'Aaron Fox (6)
| Footprint Center17,071
| 40–26
|-style="background:#fcc;"
| 67
| March 13
| Milwaukee
| 
| De'Aaron Fox (35)
| Domantas Sabonis (17)
| Domantas Sabonis (15)
| Golden 1 Center18,111
| 40–27
|-style="background:#cfc;"
| 68
| March 15
| @ Chicago
| 
| De'Aaron Fox (32)
| Domantas Sabonis (17)
| Domantas Sabonis (10)
| United Center21,886
| 41–27
|-style="background:#cfc;"
| 69
| March 16
| @ Brooklyn
| 
| Domantas Sabonis (24)
| Domantas Sabonis (21)
| Malik Monk (6)
| Barclays Center18,172
| 42–27
|-style="background:#cfc;"
| 70
| March 18
| @ Washington
| 
| Domantas Sabonis (30)
| Domantas Sabonis (9)
| Domantas Sabonis (10)
| Capital One Arena18,529
| 43–27

Transactions

Trades

Free agency

Re-signed

Additions

Subtractions

References

Sacramento Kings seasons
Sacramento Kings
Sacramento Kings
Sacramento Kings